Agynaikothrips is a genus of thrips in the family Phlaeothripidae. It occurs in Asia, with one species known from Japan and the other from Taiwan.

Species
 Agynaikothrips okinawaensis
 Agynaikothrips venapennis

References

Phlaeothripidae
Thrips genera